The CVD Cobras (formerly Edensor Park Cobras) are a rugby league club located in Sydney's South Western suburbs. They play in the Parramatta District Junior Rugby League.

History
The formation of the Edensor Park Cobras Junior Rugby League Football Club was first discussed in a meeting in the Staff Room of Governor Phillip King Primary School in 1990 between Steve Stretton and John Dunn.

Established in 1991, the first Season featured teams in the U/7, U/8, U/10, U/11 and U/13 competitions.

The year 2000 saw the Club celebrate its 10th anniversary with a special commemorative jersey being produced, which each player in the 2000 season kept as a special memento.

In 2001 the Cobras became a sub club of Cabra-Vale Diggers, and changed their name to CVD Cobras. This saw the addition of yellow to the clubs traditional colours of red and blue.

Since their inception, the cobras have proved they are a club not to be taken lightly, with at least one team reaching the Grand Finals in every season.

Recent years
Often regarded as a junior club, the Cobras in recent years have ventured into the C Grade competition where they have won the 2nd Division competition in 2007 and 2008. The 2009 season sees the inauguration of the Cobras to the 2nd Division A Grade competition. The club now fields teams in every age group from U/6's to A Grade. The Cobras won the Parramatta Club Of The Year Award in 2006, 2007 and were finalists in 2008. The Cobras finished as runners up in the 2nd Division A Grade competition in 2014, won the competition in 2015 and finished as runners up in the 1st Division A Grade competition in 2016.

Home ground
Bossley Park High School 1991–1992

Bosnjak Oval, Edensor Park 1993–Present

Club Colours/Jersey
From 1991 to 2003 their club colours were Red and Blue, in the style of the Newcastle Knights. Since the 2004 season, the club has added Yellow to their playing strip to recognise their status as a sub-club of Cabra-Vale Diggers.

Notable Juniors
Notable Players that have played at CVD Edensor Park Cobras include:
Taulima Tautai
Kelepi Tanginoa
Pauli Pauli
Trent Jennings
Jack Lee-Hang
Carlos Lopa
Lomio Mafie
Eddie Sua

Rugby league teams in Sydney
Rugby clubs established in 1991
1991 establishments in Australia